Electrokinetic phenomena are a family of several different effects that occur in heterogeneous fluids, or in porous bodies filled with fluid, or in a fast flow over a flat surface. The term heterogeneous here means a fluid containing particles. Particles can be solid, liquid or gas bubbles with sizes on the scale of a micrometer or nanometer. There is a common source of all these effects—the so-called interfacial 'double layer' of charges. Influence of an external force on the diffuse layer generates tangential motion of a fluid with respect to an adjacent charged surface. This force might be electric, pressure gradient, concentration gradient, or gravity. In addition, the moving phase might be either continuous fluid or dispersed phase.

Family
Various combinations of the driving force and moving phase determine various electrokinetic effects. According to J.Lyklema, the complete family of electrokinetic phenomena includes:

 electrophoresis, as motion of particles under influence of electric field;
 electro-osmosis, as motion of liquid in porous body under influence of electric field;
 diffusiophoresis, as motion of particles under influence of a chemical potential gradient;
 capillary osmosis, as motion of liquid in porous body under influence of the chemical potential gradient;
 sedimentation potential, as electric field generated by sedimenting colloid particles;
 streaming potential/current, as either electric potential or current generated by fluid moving through porous body, or relative to flat surface;
 colloid vibration current, as electric current generated by particles moving in fluid under influence of ultrasound;
 electric sonic amplitude, as ultrasound generated by colloidal particles in oscillating electric field.

Further reading
There are detailed descriptions of electrokinetic phenomena in many books on interface and colloid science.

See also

 Isotachophoresis
 Onsager reciprocal relations
 Surface charge
 Cationization of cotton

References

Colloidal chemistry
Condensed matter physics
Soft matter
Non-equilibrium thermodynamics
Electrochemistry